Dr. Bhimrao Ambedkar Rajkiya Mahavidyalaya, Auden Padariya, Mainpuri or Dr. Bhimrao Ambedkar Government College, Auden Padariya, Mainpuri is government degree college in Mainpuri, Uttar Pradesh. It was established in 2009 and it is affiliated to Dr. Bhimrao Ambedkar University of Agra.

Campus
College is situated about 4 km away from Mainpuri city in Auden Padariya village.

References

External links

Colleges in Mainpuri
Mainpuri
Educational institutions established in 2009
2009 establishments in Uttar Pradesh